This is a complete list of members of the New York State Senate, past and present. Members currently serving in the Senate as of July 2022 are highlighted .

See also
 New York State Senate
 Majority Leader of the New York State Senate
 New York State Assembly
 List of New York State Legislature members expelled or censured

References

New York state senators

State senators